Zuo Fen (c. 255–300) was a Chinese woman poet of the Western Jin dynasty.

Life

Zuo Fen was born in Linzi prefecture to a family of Confucian scholars. Her mother died young, but her father, Zuo Xi, became an imperial official in charge of the imperial archives. She got a good literary education and often played word games with her brother, Zuo Si, who would become a famous writer as well.

In 272 she went to the palace and became a concubine of Emperor Wu of Jin. There she wrote the Rhapsody of Thoughts on Separation, in which she expressed frustration at being separated from her family and the rest of the world. Her expression of dissatisfaction with life at the palace, which was rare, did not make her lose favour and she was raised to the highest rank of noble concubine.

The emperor regularly commanded writings from her, but she was often ill and did not play a political role at court. When Empress Yang Yan died, she wrote a song of mourning in her honour.

Zuo Fen died in 300.

References

Sources
 
 

255 births
300 deaths
Jin dynasty (266–420) poets
Jin dynasty (266–420) imperial consorts
Chinese women poets
3rd-century Chinese women writers
3rd-century writers
Writers from Zibo
Poets from Shandong
3rd-century Chinese poets